The 1982 United States Senate election in Nevada was held on November 5, 1982. Incumbent Democratic U.S. Senator Howard Cannon ran for re-election to a fifth term, but narrowly lost to Republican Chic Hecht.

Major candidates

Democratic 
Howard Cannon, incumbent U.S. Senator
James David Santini, U.S. Representative

Republican 
Chic Hecht, State Senator since 1967

Results

See also 
 1982 United States Senate elections

References 

Nevada
1982
1982 Nevada elections